Mad Max is a 1979 Australian dystopian action film directed by George Miller and produced by Byron Kennedy. Mel Gibson stars as "Mad" Max Rockatansky, a police officer turned vigilante in a near-future Australia in the midst of societal collapse. Joanne Samuel, Hugh Keays-Byrne, Steve Bisley, Tim Burns, and Roger Ward also star. James McCausland and Miller wrote the screenplay from a story by Miller and Kennedy.

Principal photography for Mad Max took place in and around Melbourne and lasted for six weeks. The film initially received a polarized reception upon its release in April 1979, although it won four AACTA Awards. Filmed on a budget of A$400,000, it earned more than US$100 million worldwide in gross revenue and set a Guinness record for most profitable film. The success of Mad Max has been credited for further opening up the global market to Australian New Wave films.

The film became the first in the Mad Max series, giving rise to three sequels: Mad Max 2 (1981), Beyond Thunderdome (1985), and Fury Road (2015). In 2020, a fifth film, to be titled Furiosa, was announced.

Plot

In a near-future dystopian Australia that is facing a breakdown of civil order primarily due to widespread oil shortages, berserk motorbike gang member Crawford "Nightrider" Montazano kills a rookie officer of the poorly-funded Main Force Patrol (MFP)—one of the last remaining law enforcement agencies—and escapes with his girlfriend in the dead officer's Pursuit Special. Nightrider is able to elude the MFP until the organisation's top pursuit man, Max Rockatansky, manages to break his concentration and steer him into a roadblock, resulting in a fiery crash that kills both Nightrider and his girlfriend.

At the MFP garage, Max is shown his new police car: a specially-built supercharged V8-powered black Pursuit Special. A conversation between Max's superior, Captain Fred "Fifi" Macaffee, and Police Commissioner Labatouche reveals the Pursuit Special was authorised to bribe Max, who is becoming weary of police work, into staying on the force.

Nightrider's motorbike gang, which is led by Toecutter and Bubba Zanetti, run riot in a town, vandalising property, stealing fuel, and terrorising the populace. A young couple attempts to escape, but the gang destroys their car and rapes them. Max and fellow officer Jim "Goose" Rains arrest Toecutter's young protégé, Johnny the Boy, at the scene. No witnesses appear in court and Johnny is deemed mentally unfit to stand trial, however, so, against Goose's furious objections, he is released into Bubba's custody.

While Goose visits a nightclub in the city that night, Johnny sabotages his police motorbike, causing it to lock up at high speed the next day and launch Goose off the road. Dazed, but uninjured, Goose borrows a ute to haul his bike back to MFP headquarters. On the way, Johnny throws a brake drum through his windshield, and he crashes again. Toecutter urges, and then forces, a reluctant Johnny to throw a match into the wreck of the ute, burning Goose alive.

After seeing Goose's charred body in the hospital ICU, Max informs Fifi that he is resigning from the MFP to save what is left of his sanity. Fifi convinces him to take some time off and think it over, so Max goes on a trip in his panel van with his wife, Jessie, and infant son, "Sprog" (Australian slang for a child). When they stop to fix the spare tyre, Jessie takes Sprog to get ice cream and is molested by Toecutter and his gang. She escapes, and the family flees to a remote farm owned by an elderly friend, May Swaisey. The gang follows and chases Jessie through the woods, and they capture Sprog while Max is off looking for them. May helps Jessie free the boy and the trio escapes in the van, but it soon breaks down. Jessie grabs Sprog and runs down the road until the gang catches up and runs them over. Sprog is killed instantly, while a comatose Jessie is brought to the ICU, where she is expected to succumb to her injuries.

Driven into a rage by the loss of his family, Max dons his police uniform and takes the black Pursuit Special without authorisation to pursue and eliminate the gang. He kills several gang members before being caught in a trap set by Toecutter, Bubba and Johnny. Bubba shoots Max in the leg and drives over his arm before Max is able to shoot Bubba with a sawn-off shotgun. Toecutter and Johnny ride away, and Max staggers to his car and chases Toecutter, whom he forces into the path of an approaching semi-truck.

After a long search, Max finds Johnny stealing boots from a dead motorist. Ignoring Johnny's desperate pleas that he did not kill the man and he is not responsible for what happened to Max's family due to his diagnosed psychopathy, Max handcuffs Johnny's ankle to the corpse's overturned vehicle and creates a crude time-delay fuse using leaking petroleum and Johnny's lighter. He gives Johnny a hacksaw, saying Johnny can either try to saw through the handcuffs, which will take ten minutes, or his ankle, which will take five minutes, to survive. The vehicle explodes as Max drives away.

Cast

 Mel Gibson as Max Rockatansky, an officer of the Main Force Patrol (MFP)
 Joanne Samuel as Jessie Rockatansky, Max's wife
 Hugh Keays-Byrne as Toecutter, the leader of a motorcycle gang
 Steve Bisley as Jim "Goose" Rains, a member of the MFP's motorcycle unit
 Tim Burns as Johnny the Boy, a young member of Toecutter's gang
 Roger Ward as Fred "Fifi" Macaffee, Max's MFP captain
 David Bracks as Mudguts, a member of Toecutter's gang
 David Cameron as Underground Mechanic, who builds the V-8 Pursuit Special
 Robina Chaffey as Singer, who performs at the Sugartown Cabaret
 Stephen Clark as Sarse, an MFP officer (Scuttle's partner)
 Reg Evans as Station Master
 Max Fairchild as Benno, May's large adult son, who has an intellectual disability
 Sheila Florence as May Swaisey, an old friend of Max
 Hunter Gibb as Lair, a man with a Chevvy who is attacked by Toecutter's gang
 Vincent Gil as Crawford "The Nightrider" Montazano, a member of Toecutter's gang
 Jonathan Hardy as Police Commissioner Labatouche, who oversees the MFP
 Brendan Heath as "Sprog" Rockatansky, Max and Jessie's infant son
 Paul Johnstone as Cundalini, a member of Toecutter's gang who loses a hand
 Nick Lathouris as Grease Rat, a mechanic near a beach
 John Ley as Charlie, a religious MFP officer (Roop's partner)
 Steve Millichamp as Roop, an MFP officer (Charlie's partner)
 George Novak as Scuttle, an MFP officer (Sarse's partner)
 Geoff Parry as Bubba Zanetti, Toecutter's second in command
 Lulu Pinkus as Nightrider's Girl
 Kim Sullivan as Girl in Chevvy, who, along with Lair, is attacked by Toecutter's gang
 Karen Moregold as Radio Dispatcher (uncredited)

Production

Development
George Miller was a medical doctor in Sydney, working in a hospital emergency room where he saw many injuries and deaths of the types depicted in the film. He also witnessed many car accidents growing up in rural Queensland and lost at least three friends to accidents as a teenager.

While in residency at a Sydney hospital, Miller met amateur filmmaker Byron Kennedy at a summer film school in 1971. The two men produced a short film, Violence in the Cinema, Part 1, which was screened at a number of film festivals and won several awards. Eight years later, they produced Mad Max, working with first-time screenwriter James McCausland (who appears early in the film as the bearded man in an apron in front of the diner).

According to Miller, his interest while writing Mad Max was "a silent movie with sound", employing highly kinetic images reminiscent of Buster Keaton and Harold Lloyd while the narrative itself was basic and simple. Miller believed that audiences would find his violent story more believable if set in a bleak dystopian future. He knew little about writing a script, but he had read Pauline Kael's essay "Raising Kane" and concluded that most major American scriptwriters, like Herman Mankiewicz and Ben Hecht, were former journalists, so he hired McCausland, the Melbourne finance editor of The Australian, with whom he had previously bonded at a party as a fellow film buff. McCausland was paid roughly $3,500 for about a year's worth of writing.

The basic concept for the film was already established when McCausland was brought on to the project. He worked from a one-page outline prepared by Miller, writing each evening from about 7pm to midnight. Miller would then arrive at 6am to confer on the pages. McCausland had never written a script before and did no formal or informal study in preparation, other than going repeatedly to the cinema with Miller and discussing the dramatic structure of westerns, road movies, and action films. McCausland described taking the lead in writing the dialogue, while Miller was concerned with giving his thoughts on the narrative context of each part and thinking through the visual beats of how things would unfold on screen. The ornate and hyper-verbal speech of Mad Max's villains, like the manic Nightrider in the opening sequence, which would recur through the subsequent films in the franchise, in this sense stems from McCausland's work, albeit under Miller's instruction. McCausland drew heavily from his observations of the effects of the 1973 oil crisis on Australian motorists:

Kennedy and Miller first took the film to Graham Burke of Roadshow, who was enthusiastic. The producers felt they would be unable to raise money from the government bodies "because Australian producers were making art films, and the corporations and commissions seemed to endorse them whole-heartedly", according to Kennedy. They designed a 40-page presentation, circulated it widely, and eventually raised the money. Kennedy and Miller also contributed funds themselves by doing three months of emergency medical calls, with Kennedy driving the car while Miller did the doctoring. Miller claimed the final budget was between $350,000 and $400,000. His brother Bill Miller was an associate producer on the film.

Casting
George Miller considered casting an American actor to "get the film seen as widely as possible" and even travelled to Los Angeles, but eventually opted to not do so as "the whole budget would be taken up by a so-called American name." Instead, the cast deliberately featured lesser-known actors, so they did not carry past associations with them. Miller's first choice for the role of Max was the Irish-born James Healey, who at the time worked at a Melbourne abattoir and was seeking a new acting job. Upon reading the script, Healey declined, finding the meager, terse dialogue unappealing.

Casting director Mitch Mathews invited a class of recent National Institute of Dramatic Art graduates to audition for Mad Max, specifically asking a NIDA teacher for "spunky young guys". Among these actors was American-born Mel Gibson, whose audition impressed Miller and Matthews and earned him the role of Max. An apocryphal tale stated that Gibson went to auditions with a beat-up face following a fight, but this has been denied by both Matthews and Miller. Gibson's friend and classmate Steve Bisley, who had worked with him in his only previous screen role, 1976's Summer City, was cast as Max's partner Jim Goose. A classmate of both, Judy Davis, has been said to have auditioned and been passed over, but Miller has declared she was only in Matthews' studio to accompany Gibson and Bisley.

Most of the biker gang extras were members of actual Australian outlaw motorcycle clubs and rode their own motorcycles in the film. They were even forced to ride the motorcycles from their residence in Sydney to the shooting locations in Melbourne because the budget did not allow for aerial transport. Three of the main cast members (Hugh Keays-Byrne, Roger Ward and Vincent Gil) had previously appeared in Stone, a 1974 film about biker gangs that is said to have inspired Miller.

Vehicles

Max's yellow Interceptor was a 1974 Ford Falcon XB sedan (previously a Victoria police car) with a 351 c.i.d. Cleveland V8 engine.

The Big Bopper, driven by Roop and Charlie, was also a 1974 Ford Falcon XB sedan and a former Victoria police car, but was powered by a 302 c.i.d. V8. The March Hare, driven by Sarse and Scuttle, was an in-line-six-powered 1972 Ford Falcon XA sedan (this car was formerly a Melbourne taxi cab).

Max's black Pursuit Special was a 1973 Ford XB Falcon GT351, a limited edition hardtop (sold in Australia from December 1973 to August 1976), which was primarily modified by Murray Smith, Peter Arcadipane, and Ray Beckerley. The main modifications were the Concorde front end and the supercharger protruding through the bonnet (for looks only; it was not functional). The Concorde front was a fairly new accessory at the time, designed by Peter Arcadipane at Ford Australia as a showpiece, and later became available to the general public because of its popularity. After filming for Mad Max was completed, the car went up for sale, but no buyer was found, so it was given to Smith. He kept it until Miller wanted to use it for Mad Max 2, after which it again found no buyers and was left at a wrecking yard in Adelaide. It was bought and restored by Bob Forsenko, who later sold it to the Cars of the Stars Motor Museum in Cumbria, England. When the museum closed, the car went to a collection in the Dezer Museum in Miami, Florida.

The Nightrider's vehicle, another Pursuit Special, was a 1972 Holden HQ Monaro coupe. It was also tuned, but was deliberately damaged to make it look like it had been involved in crashes.

The car driven by the young couple that is vandalised and then finally destroyed by the bikers is a 1959 Chevrolet Bel Air Sedan modified to look like a hot rod, with fake fuel injection stacks, fat tires, and a flame-red paint job.

Of the motorcycles that appear in the film, 14 were Kawasaki Kz1000 donated by a local Kawasaki dealer. All were modified in appearance by Melbourne business La Parisienne: one as the MFP bike ridden by Goose, and the balance for members of Toecutter's gang, many of which were portrayed by members of a local Victorian motorcycle club, the Vigilantes.

By the end of filming, fourteen vehicles had been destroyed in the chase and crash scenes, including the director's personal Mazda Bongo (the small, blue van that spins uncontrollably after being struck by the Big Bopper in the film's opening chase).

Filming

Originally, filming was scheduled to take ten weeks: six weeks of first unit, and four weeks on stunt and chase sequences. However, four days into shooting, Rosie Bailey, who was originally cast as Max's wife, was injured in a bike accident. Production was halted, and Bailey was replaced by Joanne Samuel, causing a two-week delay. In the end, the shoot lasted six weeks in November and December 1977, with a further six weeks of second-unit work. The unit reconvened in May 1978 and spent another two weeks doing second-unit shots and re-staging some stunts.

Miller described the whole experience as "guerrilla filmmaking", with the crew closing roads without filming permits and not using walkie-talkies because their frequency coincided with the police radio, and he and Kennedy would even sweep down the roads after filming was done. As filming progressed, however, the Victoria Police became interested in the production, and they began to help the crew by closing down roads and escorting vehicles. Because of the low budget, all but one of the police uniforms in the film were made of vinyl leather, with only one genuine leather uniform made for stunt sequences involving Bisley and Gibson.

Filming took place in and around Melbourne. Many of the car chase scenes were filmed near the town of Little River, northeast of Geelong. The early town scenes with Toecutter's gang were filmed in the main street of Clunes, north of Ballarat; much of the streetscape remains unchanged. The bunker on which Roop was sitting, the site where Goose takes his ride, and the gate Big Bopper slides through are in Point Wilson. The "execution of the mannequin" scene was filmed at Seaford Beach in Seaford, Victoria.

David Eggby recalled the production as "often fraught with incidents and accidents". Eggby said Miller temporarily quit the production, and Byron contacted Brian Trenchard-Smith. Trenchard-Smith recommended hiring a new first assistant director. Miller completed the film, but Eggby said the crew did not respect him. 

Safety control was supervised by Ian Goddard, an internationally known motorcycle racer. Goddard and his four assistants, aided by an extensive radio communications network, were so diligent in their work that not a single accident occurred during filming.

Mad Max was one of the first Australian films to be shot with a widescreen anamorphic lens, although Peter Weir's The Cars That Ate Paris (1974) was shot in anamorphic four years earlier. Miller's desire to shoot in anamorphic made him seek out a set of Todd-AO wide-angle lenses that Sam Peckinpah had discarded in Australia after they became damaged while filming The Getaway (1972). The only lens that worked properly was a 35mm lens, which Miller employed to shoot the whole of Mad Max.

Post-production
The film's post-production was done at a friend's apartment in North Melbourne, with Miller and Kennedy editing the film in the small lounge room on a home-built editing machine that Kennedy's father, an engineer, had designed for them. Miller and Kennedy also performed sound editing there. Tony Patterson spent four months editing the film, then had to leave because he was contracted to work on Dimboola (1979). George Miller took over editing with Cliff Hayes, and they worked for an additional three months. Kennedy and Miller did the final cut, in a process Miller described as "he would cut sound in the lounge room and I’d cut picture in the kitchen."

Professional sound engineer Roger Savage performed the sound mixing in a studio after finishing his work for Little River Band. He employed timecoding techniques that were previously unseen in Australian cinema.

Music

The musical score for Mad Max was composed and conducted by Australian composer Brian May (not to be confused with the guitarist of the English rock band Queen). Miller wanted a Gothic, Bernard Herrmann–type score and hired May after hearing his work for Patrick (1978). May said: "With the little budget that we had we went ahead and did it, and spent a lot of time on it. George was marvelous to work with; he had a lot of ideas about what he wanted although he wasn’t a musician."

A soundtrack album was released in 1980 by Varèse Sarabande.

Release
Mad Max was first released in Australia through Roadshow Film Distributors (now Village Roadshow Pictures) in 1979. It was sold overseas for $1.8 million—American International Pictures (AIP) acquired the distribution rights for the United States (it would be one of the last films released by AIP before the company was folded into Filmways), while Warner Bros. handled the rest of the world. The film was banned in New Zealand and Sweden, in the former because the scene in which Goose is burned alive inside his vehicle unintentionally mirrored an incident with a real gang shortly before the film's release. In 1983, after the success of the sequel, Mad Max was shown in New Zealand with an R18 certificate. The ban in Sweden was removed in 2005, and the film has since been shown on television and sold on home media there.

When Mad Max was released in the United States in 1980, the original Australian dialogue was redubbed by American voice actors, and much of the Australian slang and terminology was replaced (examples: "Oi!" became "Hey!", "See looks!" became "See what I see?", "windscreen" became "windshield", "very toey" became "super hot", and "proby"—probationary officer—became "rookie"). AIP also altered the operator's duty call on Jim Goose's bike in the beginning of the film (it ended with "Come on, Goose, where are you?"). The only exceptions to the dubbing were the singer in the Sugartown Cabaret (played by Robina Chaffey), Charlie (played by John Ley) when he speaks through the mechanical voice box, and Goose (Steve Bisley) when he sings while driving the truck before being ambushed. Since Mel Gibson was not well known to American audiences at the time, trailers and television spots in the United States emphasised the film's action content. The original Australian dialogue track was finally released in North America in 2000 in a limited theatrical reissue by MGM (the film's rights holders at the time), and the film has since been released in the U.S. on DVD with the American and Australian soundtracks included on separate audio tracks. In 2021, North American rights to Mad Max reverted to Warner Bros., so WB now fully owns all four films in the Mad Max series everywhere except for Australia and New Zealand.

Home media
The film was released on DVD on 1 January 2002 and re-released on DVD on 15 September 2015. It was released on Blu-ray on 5 October 2010 and re-released on Blu-ray on 15 September 2015 by 20th Century Fox. Kino Lorber (on behalf of Warner Bros. Home Entertainment, under license to MGM Home Entertainment) released the film on 4K Blu-ray Disc on 24 November 2020. On 16 November 2021 (by which time North American rights to the film had reverted to WB), it was reissued in 4K along with the three other films in the series as part of the "Mad Max Anthology" 4K set from Warner Bros. Home Entertainment.

Reception

Box office
Mad Max grossed A$5,355,490 at the box office in Australia and over US$100 million worldwide. Given its small production budget, it was the most profitable film ever made at the time and held the Guinness World Record for the highest box-office-to-budget ratio of any motion picture until the release of The Blair Witch Project (1999).

Critical response
Upon its release, the film polarized critics. In a 1979 review, the Australian social commentator and film producer Phillip Adams condemned Mad Max, saying that it had "all the emotional uplift of Mein Kampf and would be "a special favourite of rapists, sadists, child murderers and incipient Mansons". After its United States release, Tom Buckley of The New York Times called the film "ugly and incoherent", and Stephen King, writing in Danse Macabre, called it a "turkey". However, Variety magazine praised the directorial debut by Miller.

The film was awarded three Australian Film Institute Awards in 1979 (for editing, musical score, and sound), and was given a special award for stunt work; it was also nominated for Best Film, Best Director, Best Original Screenplay, and Best Supporting Actor (Hugh Keays-Byrne). At the Avoriaz Fantastic Film Festival, the film won the Special Jury Award.

On review aggregator website Rotten Tomatoes, the film holds a 91% approval rating based on 64 reviews, with an average score of 7.8/10; the site's "critics consensus" reads: "Staging the improbable car stunts and crashes to perfection, director George Miller succeeds completely in bringing the violent, post-apocalyptic world of Mad Max to visceral life." The film has been included in "best 1,000 films of all time" lists from The New York Times and The Guardian.

Accolades

Legacy

References

External links

 —home to the original Mad Max film, maintained by members of the cast and crew.
 
 
 
 
 
 
 Mad Max at Oz Movies

Mad Max films
1979 films
1970s science fiction action films
Australian science fiction action films
Dystopian films
Films about automobiles
Australian films about revenge
Films directed by George Miller
Films set in Australia
Films set in the future
Films shot in Melbourne
Kennedy Miller Mitchell films
Peak oil films
Australian road movies
1970s road movies
Australian vigilante films
Films scored by Brian May (composer)
1970s exploitation films
Films with screenplays by George Miller
1979 directorial debut films
Warner Bros. films
1970s English-language films
Australian exploitation films